Aethes monera is a species of moth of the family Tortricidae. It was described by Razowski in 1986. It is found in North America, where it has been recorded from Mexico (Durango), Alberta and Saskatchewan.

Subspecies
Aethes monera monera
Aethes monera septentrionalis Razowski, 1997 (Canada)

References

monera
Moths described in 1986
Moths of North America
Taxa named by Józef Razowski